US Sétif is an Algerian basketball team. The club is based in Sétif, Algeria. The team has been playing in the Super Division since 2011–12 season after advancing the teams of MS Cherchel, USM Blida and COB Oran during the play-off tournament And occupation of first place. then and in the 2014–15 season US Sétif reached for the first time the Algerian Basketball Championship final and lost to the GS Pétroliers 2-1. after that US Sétif reached the Algerian Cup final twice in a row 2016, 2017 and lost again against the same team GS Pétroliers.

Roster (men)

Statistics

Season by season

Trophies
Algerian Basketball Championship: 0
Algerian Basketball Cup: 0

References

External links
Team profile at Eurobasket.com

Basketball teams in Algeria
2002 establishments in Algeria
Basketball teams established in 2002